Barbigha is a city and a municipality in the Sheikhpura district of Bihar, India. It is well connected by road to the state capital of Patna. National highways NH33 and NH333A also pass through Barbigha, and Bihta-Sarmera four lane state highway passes from Gopalbad near it.

Demographics
According to the 2011 Indian census, Barbigha had a population of 56,075, of whom 28,246 were male and 27,829 were female. The sex ratio of Barbigha (number of females compared to number of males) is .900, against the state average of .918. Moreover, the child sex ratio is .910, compared to the Bihar state average of .935. The literacy rate of Barbigha is 73.63%, higher than the state average of 61.80%; with a male literacy rate of 81.27% and the female rate at 65.12%. 19% of the population were under 6 years of age.

The name is said to derive from the Hindi phrase , meaning "twelve bigha". Barbigha has grown to become the biggest town market of the Sheikhpura district, serving as a commercial market for the surrounding villages. Sri Krishan Singh (First Chief Minister of Bihar) was from Barbigha and Rastrakavi Ramdhari Singh Dinkar served as headmaster of a high school in Barbigha.

Education  
S.K.R College is a constituent unit of Munger University previously Bhagalpur University. R. Lal College is also situated in Barbigha affiliated from Patliputra University. Other degree colleges are Sundar Singh College Mehus, Neemi College, Sai College, and C.N.B College in Hathiyama etc. Government Polytechnic College and Government ITI College are also two Technical College situated in Barbigha.

Other CBSE affiliated schools include Gyan Niketan Residential School, SPS Public School, Divine Light Public School, St Mary's English School, Vikash International Public School, G.I.P Public School, Adarsh Vidya Bharti, Barbigha Central School etc. Bihar Government affiliated schools are Raj Rajeshwar +2 School, Barbigha Town High School, Tailik Balika Inter School, High School kutaut, Kasturba Gandhi Balika Vidyalaya Kutaut, +2 School Mehus, Sri Satya Sai Vidya Mandir, Bhadarthi and many more institutions in Barbigha City.

References

Cities and towns in Sheikhpura district